Vangelis-Giorgos Voglis (born on 17 December 1977) is a Greek handball player. He competed in the men's handball tournament at the 2004 Summer Olympics.

References

1977 births
Living people
Greek male handball players
Handball players at the 2004 Summer Olympics
Olympic handball players of Greece
Sportspeople from Stockholm